The 2018 Emerging Nations World Championship (ENWC) was a rugby league tournament held for Tier Two and Tier Three nations, the third edition of the Rugby League Emerging Nations Tournament.

Background
Several nations that had not qualified, or were not eligible to qualify, for the 2017 Rugby League World Cup planned to contest an Emerging Nations tournament in Sydney in 2017 alongside the World Cup. However this tournament did not get support from the Rugby League International Federation, and did not go ahead.

On 29 March 2017, the Rugby League International Federation announced that Australia will be host the tournament in 2018. The two-week-long tournament will be held in Western Sydney, New South Wales with games taking place in Windsor, St Marys and Cabramatta.

Teams
Ten teams were already confirmed for the tournament by March 2017 with a number of others later also announcing their participation. 15 teams were expected to compete, though Canada, India, Latvia, and Thailand were not included in the final draw, for unspecified reasons.

Four multi-country regional teams will compete in a parallel tournament.

Venues

 Cabramatta: New Era Stadium, home of the Cabramatta Two Blues, has previously hosted four international fixtures: Philippines vs Serbia (2016), Philippines vs Malta, Lebanon vs Malta, and Malta vs Hungary (all 2017).
 Kellyville: Kellyville Ridge Reserve, all-weather synthetic pitch previously unused at any level, hosted games on 7 October as Cabramatta was closed due to flooding.
 St Marys: St Marys Leagues Stadium, home of the St Marys Saints, has previously hosted six international fixtures: Fiji vs Tonga, Samoa vs Cook Islands, Lebanon vs Malta (all 2006), Lebanon vs Malta (2015), Malta vs Hungary, South Africa vs Malta (both 2018). It contains a 520-seat grandstand and has a total capacity of 7,000.
 Windsor: Windsor Sporting Complex, home of the Windsor Wolves, has not previously hosted an international fixture.

Pool stage

Tournament fixtures were announced on 17 July 2018.

Pool A

Pool B

Pool C

Play-offs

Plate

Trophy

Cup

Final positions

References

External links
RLENWC.com 

2018 in rugby league
Rugby League Emerging Nations Tournament
Emerging Nations World Championship